NB: The scheduled routes given here are based primarily on the timetable of the Deutsche Bahn dated 9 December 2007.

Timetable routes 
The numbering of German timetabled routes (Kursbuchstrecken or KBS) was changed twice by the Deutsche Bundesbahn after the Second World War, in 1950 and 1970. In the Deutsche Reichsbahn (East Germany) the numbering system was completely changed in 1968. The last major revision took place after German reunification in 1992, as a result of which a common system for DB and DR routes was introduced. In addition changes, usually minor, are made annually.

Hamburg and coastal region (100 to 199) 
 (former Bundesbahn division of Hamburg and Reichsbahn divisions Schwerin and Greifswald)

Berlin/Brandenburg/Saxony-Anhalt/East Saxony (200 to 299)

Lower Saxony/Saxony-Anhalt region (300 to 399) 

(ehem. Bundesbahndirektion Hanover)

North Rhine-Westphalia Region (400 to 499) 
 (former Bundesbahn divisions Essen and Cologne, see also: List of SPNV lines in NRW)

Saxony/Thuringia region (500 to 599) 
 As at timetable period 2016/2017

West Thuringia/Hesse/Nordbaden/Rhineland-Palatinate/Saarland Region (600 to 699) 
 (former RBD Erfurt, Bundesbahn divisions Frankfurt and Saarbrücken, see also: List of RMV lines)

Baden-Württemberg region (700 to 799) 
 (former Bundesbahn divisions Karlsruhe and Stuttgart)

 * This description is not used in the timetable, but is a commonly used name for the line.
 ** By Rems Railway only the section from Stuttgart to Aalen is implied today; KBS 786 includes the whole route to Nuremberg however. Originally the Rems Valley Railway ran further to Nördlingen (see KBS 995), this section is designated by the DB today as the Ries Railway (derived from the landscape of the Nördlinger Ries).

North Bavarian region (800 to 899) 
 (former Bundesbahn divisions Nuremberg, Regensburg)

North Bavarian/South Bavarian region (900 to 999) 
 (former Bundesbahn divisions Munich, Augsburg, parts of Regensburg and Nuremberg)

Mountain railways

Museum railways and park railways

See also 
Rail transport in Germany
German railway station categories
railway station types of Germany

References

External links 
 Online timetable of DB services
 DB-Kursbuch
 DRE-Streckenverzeichnis

Railway lines in Germany
Railway routes